Eager may refer to:

Eager (band)
Eager (horse), (1788 – after 1795), a British Thoroughbred racehorse
Eager (novel), a children's science-fiction novel written by Helen Fox
Eager (surname)
, an Admirable-class minesweeper built for the United States Navy during World War II

See also

Eagers
Eager beaver (disambiguation)
Eagre, another term for a tidal bore
Eger (disambiguation)